Charuka Wijelath (born 2 April 1992) is a Sri Lankan cricketer. He made his Twenty20 debut for Sri Lanka Navy Sports Club in the 2018–19 SLC Twenty20 Tournament on 15 February 2019. He made his List A debut for Sri Lanka Navy Sports Club in the 2018–19 Premier Limited Overs Tournament on 10 March 2019.

References

External links
 

1992 births
Living people
Sri Lankan cricketers
Sri Lanka Navy Sports Club cricketers
Place of birth missing (living people)